Vance Joy is an Australian singer and songwriter. He has received 13 awards from 73 nominations.

AIR Awards

!
|-
!scope="row" rowspan="2" |2013
|Himself
|Breakthrough Independent Artist
|
| style="text-align:center;" rowspan="2"|
|-
|God Love You When You're Dancing
|Best Independent Single/EP
|
|-
!scope="row" rowspan="3" |2015
|Himself
|Best Independent Artist
|
| style="text-align:center;" rowspan="3"|
|-
|Dream Your Life Away
|Best Independent Album
|
|-
|"Fire and the Flood"
|Best Independent Single/EP
|
|-
!scope="row" rowspan="2" | 2022
| "Missing Piece"
| Independent Song of the Year
| 
|

APRA Music Awards

!
|-
!scope="row" rowspan="4" |2014
|Himself
|Breakthrough Songwriter of the Year
|
| style="text-align:center;" rowspan="4"|
|-
|rowspan="3"| "Riptide" 
|Most Played Australian Work
|
|-
|Pop Work of the Year
|
|-
|Song of the Year
|
|-
!scope="row" rowspan="2"|2016
|rowspan="2"|"Georgia"
|Most Played Australian Work
|
| style="text-align:center;" rowspan="2"|
|-
|Pop Work of the Year
|
|-
!scope="row"|2017
|"Riptide"
|Most Played Australian Work Overseas
|
| style="text-align:center;"|
|-
!scope="row" rowspan="2"|2018
|rowspan="2"|"Lay It On Me"
|Pop Work of the Year
|
| style="text-align:center;"|
|-
|Song of the Year
| 
|  style="text-align:center;"|
|-
!scope="row" rowspan="2"|2019
|rowspan="2"|"We're Going Home"
|Most Played Work of the Year
|
| rowspan="2" style="text-align:center;"|
|-
|Pop Work of the Year
|
|-
!scope="row" rowspan="3"|2022
|rowspan="2"|"Missing Piece"
|Most Performed Australian Work
|
| rowspan="3" style="text-align:center;"|
|-
|Most Performed Alternative Work
|
|-
|"You" 
|Most Performed Pop Work
|
|-
!scope="row"| 2023 
| "Clarity"
| Song of the Year 
|  
|  
|-
|}

ARIA Music Awards

!
|-
!scope="row" rowspan="5" |2013
|rowspan="2" |God Loves You When You're Dancing
|Breakthrough Artist – Release
|
| style="text-align:center;" rowspan="5"|
|-
|Best Pop Release
|
|-
|rowspan="2" |"Riptide"
|Song of the Year
|
|-
|Best Video
|
|-
|Mélodie Française
|Best World Music Album
|
|-
!scope="row" rowspan="2"|2014
|rowspan="2"|"Mess Is Mine"
|Best Male Artist
|
| style="text-align:center;" rowspan="2"|
|-
|Best Independent Release
|
|-
!scope="row" rowspan="7" |2015
|rowspan="4" |Dream Your Life Away
|Album of the Year
|
| style="text-align:center;" rowspan="7"|
|-
|Best Male Artist
|
|-
|Best Independent Release
|
|-
|Best Pop Release
|
|-
|rowspan="2" |"Georgia"
|Song of the Year
|
|-
|Best Video
|
|-
|Dream Your Life Away Tour
|Best Australian Live Act
|
|-
!scope="row" rowspan="2" |2017
|rowspan="2" |"Lay It on Me"
|Best Male Artist
|
| style="text-align:center;" rowspan="2"|
|-
|Best Independent Release
|
|-
!scope="row" rowspan="3" |2018
|rowspan="2" |Nation of Two
|Best Male Artist
|
| style="text-align:center;" rowspan="3"|
|-
|Best Adult Contemporary Album
|
|-
|"Lay It on Me"
|Song of the Year	
|
|-
!scope="row" rowspan="5" |2021
|rowspan="5" |"Missing Piece"
|Best Artist
|
|style="text-align:center;" rowspan="5"|
|-
|Best Independent Release
|
|-
|Best Pop Release
|
|-
|Song of the Year	
|
|-
|Best Video
|
|-
!scope="row" rowspan="5" | 2022
| rowspan="2"| In Our Own Sweet Time
| Best Solo Artist
| 
| rowspan="5"| 
|-
| Best Adult Contemporary Album
| 
|-
| rowspan="2"| "Clarity"
| Best Pop Release
| 
|-
| Song of the Year
| 
|-
| "Every Side of You" (Vance Joy and William Bleakley)
| Best Video
| 
|-
|}

ASCAP Pop Music Awards

!
|-
!scope="row"|2016
|"Riptide"
| Most Performed Songs
|
| style="text-align:center;"|
|-
|}

CBC Music Awards

!
|-
!scope="row"|2014
|Himself
|Best International Artist
|
| style="text-align:center;" rowspan="4"|
|}

Channel [V] Awards

!
|-
!scope="row"|2013
|rowspan="2" |Himself
|rowspan="2" |[V] Oz Artist of the Year
|
| style="text-align:center;"|
|-
!scope="row"|2014
|
| style="text-align:center;"|
|-
|}

Helpmann Awards

!
|-
!scope="row"|2016
|The Fire and the Flood Tour
|Best Australian Contemporary Concert
|
| style="text-align:center;"|
|}

International Songwriting Competition

!
|-
!scope="row"|2014
|"Riptide"
|Grand Prize
|
| style="text-align:center;"|
|}

J Award
The J Awards are an annual series of Australian music awards that were established by the Australian Broadcasting Corporation's youth-focused radio station Triple J. They commenced in 2005.

!
|-
| 2013
|"Riptide"
| Australian Video of the Year
| 
| style="text-align:center;"|

Juno Awards

!
|-
!scope="row"|2016
|Dream Your Life Away
|International Album of the Year
|
| style="text-align:center;"|
|-
|}

MTV Awards

MTV Europe Music Award

!
|-
!scope="row"|2015
|rowspan="3"|Himself
|rowspan="3"|Best Australian Act
|
| style="text-align:center;"|
|-
!scope="row"|2016
|
| style="text-align:center;"|
|-
!scope="row"|2022
|
| style="text-align:center;"|
|}

MTV Video Music Awards

!
|-
!scope="row"|2015
|Himself
|Artist to Watch
|
| style="text-align:center;"|
|-
|}

Music Victoria Awards

!
|-
!scope="row"|2013
|"Riptide"
|Best Song
|
| style="text-align:center;"|
|-
!scope="row"|2014
|rowspan="2"|Himself
|Best Male Artist
|
| style="text-align:center;"|
|-
!scope="row"|2018
|Best Solo Artist
|
| style="text-align:center;"|
|}

National Live Music Awards

!
|-
!scope="row"|2016
|Himself
|Best International Live Achievement – Solo
|
| style="text-align:center;"|
|-
|}

Newbie Awards

!
|-
!scope="row"|2014
|Himself
|Best New Male Artist
|
| style="text-align:center;"|
|-
|}

POPrepublic.tv IT List Awards

!
|-
!scope="row" rowspan="2" |2014
|rowspan="2" |Himself
|Australian Male Artist	
|
| style="text-align:center;" rowspan="2" | 
|-
|Breakthrough Artist
|
|-
|}

Rolling Stone Australia Awards
The Rolling Stone Australia Awards are awarded annually in January or February by the Australian edition of Rolling Stone magazine for outstanding contributions to popular culture in the previous year.

! 
|-
|rowspan="3" | 2023
| In Our Own Sweet Time
| Best Record
| 
|rowspan="3" | 
|-
| "Clarity"
| Best Single
| 
|-
| Vance Joy
| Rolling Stone Global Award
|

The AU Awards

!
|-
!scope="row"|2015
|Himself
|Best International Live Achievement – Solo Artist
|
| style="text-align:center;"|
|-
|}

VH1's Big Music: You Oughta Know

!
|-
!scope="row"|2014
|Himself
|Artist of the Year
|
| style="text-align:center;"|
|-
|}

World Music Awards

!
|-
!scope="row" rowspan="4" |2014
|rowspan="2" |"Riptide"
|World's Best Video
|
| style="text-align:center;" rowspan="4" |
|-
|World's Best Song
|
|-
|rowspan="2" |Himself
|World's Best Male Artist
|
|-
|World's Best Live Act
|
|-
|}

Notes

References

Joy, Vance
Awards